Rincon or Rincon Grande is a settlement on East Falkland, in the Falkland Islands, on the east shore of Salvador Water, at its north end.  refers to a point of land, and such early settlements were often started where cattle could be herded onto boats. It is east of Salvador across the water, and west of Port Louis and Johnson's Harbour
It is one of the oldest settlements in the area.

The closest major cities include Bahía Blanca, Mar del Plata, Neuquén, and Temuco.

References

Populated places on East Falkland